Polyonax (meaning "master over many") was a genus of ceratopsid dinosaur from the late Maastrichtian-age Upper Cretaceous Denver Formation of Colorado, United States.  Founded upon poor remains, it is today regarded as a dubious name.

History
During an 1873 trip through the western US, paleontologist and naturalist Edward Drinker Cope collected some fragmentary dinosaurian material which he soon named as a new genus. Catalogued today as AMNH FR 3950, the type material included three dorsal vertebrae, limb bone material, and what are now known to be horn cores, from a subadult individual. Although it was briefly mixed up with hadrosaurs, and even considered to be a possible synonym of Trachodon, it was recognized as a horned dinosaur in time for the first monograph on horned dinosaurs (1907), wherein it was regarded as based on indeterminate material. Today, the name is used as little more than a historical curiosity, as it dates from a time before horned dinosaurs were known to exist. The most recent review listed it as an indeterminate ceratopsid.

It has sometimes been listed as a synonym of Agathaumas, or Triceratops.

Paleobiology
As a ceratopsid, Polyonax would have been a large, quadrupedal herbivore, with brow and nasal horns and a neck frill.

See also

 Timeline of ceratopsian research

References

Chasmosaurines
Late Cretaceous dinosaurs of North America
Nomina dubia
Fossil taxa described in 1874
Taxa named by Edward Drinker Cope
Paleontology in Colorado
Maastrichtian genus first appearances
Maastrichtian genus extinctions
Ornithischian genera